The Guelph Farmers' Market has served as a cultural and commercial anchor in downtown Guelph since the first Market House was built in 1827. After 180 years it is still going strong and remains a popular stop on Saturday mornings for both locals and visitors. The Guelph Farmers' Market's website proclaims "Buy Local - Buy Fresh", reflecting the growing trend to "eat where you live" which is supported by local, national, international organizations and popular opinion.

The Farmers Market occupies a single building and surrounding outdoor space, housing approximately 60 vendors in winter, with numbers swelling to over 120 vendors during the summer and early fall.  Vendors at the market offer a variety of products and services, including fresh produce, baked goods, crafts, personal care products, clothing, photography and a collection of works by local artists. The venue also plays host to a number of charitable events throughout the year.

The market currently stands at the corner of Gordon St and Waterloo Ave in what was previously the show horse barn. It was relocated to this location in 1968.

History 
The original Market House was erected in 1827 for the Canada Company whose Canadian Superintendent John Galt saw it as part of his vision to make Guelph the centre of Ontario’s farming industry.  The location was determined, according to folklore, when Galt placed his hand, with fingers outstretched upon a tree stump and proclaimed that as his fingers radiated from his hand so too would the proposed streets of his new town.
The building itself was a rather rough and primitive structure with a cottage roof, twelve sets of double posts of squared timber and open sides. The new Market Square also held an added benefit for the Canada Company; it created an increase in the land values for the area of which John had had the foresight to purchase before introducing his concept.

In 1857, after five years of political fighting between the merchants, tradesmen, farmers, and town officials, a new stone Market House/Town Hall was built to accommodate the growing market, municipal government offices, and local fire and police services. The Farmers' Market remained at Market House until 1968.

In 1968 the market moved to the Show Horse Barn, which was constructed in 1911 for the Provincial Winter Fair, while the Market House/Town Hall was rebuilt and re-purposed as the Guelph City Hall.  The Market has remained at its current location ever since.

Location Timeline 
 1827 – John Galt breaks ground on construction of the original Market House
 1857 – The Market House/Town Hall is built to replace the original Market House which needed more space.  A portion of this new building was used by town council, the local fire department and the police.
 1874 – An addition is added that includes a second floor concert hall but the main floor remained home to the market
 1902 – A second addition is added to the Wilson Street side of the building to house cattle, a lecture room, boiler room and  poultry area.
 1911 - The Show Horse Barn is built as part of the Provincial Winter Fair that made its home in Guelph in 1889
 1939 – Buildings used for the Provincial Winter Fair are taken over by the Military to house soldiers and carry out training exercises.
 1968 – The Show Horse Barn, no longer needed when the Provincial Winter Fair moves to Toronto and becomes the Royal Winter Fair, becomes the new home of the Farmers Market when it moves from Market House which was rebuilt to become City Hall.

See also 
 Guelph City of Guelph
 Downtown Guelph Downtown Guelph
 Wellington County, Ontario Wellington Country
 Guelph/Eramosa, Ontario Township of Eramosa/Guelph
 Fergus, Ontario Township of Centre Wellington

References

External links 
  Guelph Farmers' Market website
  Farmers' Markets Ontario
  Farmers' Markets Canada
  City of Guelph Recreation and Culture
  A Walking Tour of Guelph

Buildings and structures in Guelph
Culture of Guelph
Farmers' markets in Ontario
Tourist attractions in Guelph
History of Guelph